Mário Reis (born 25 June 1947) is a retired Portuguese football midfielder and later manager.

References

External link
Fora de Jogo Profile

1947 births
Living people
Footballers from Porto
Portuguese footballers
S.C. Salgueiros players
Rio Ave F.C. players
Association football midfielders
Portuguese football managers
Primeira Liga managers
Rio Ave F.C. managers
C.D. Aves managers

S.C. Salgueiros managers
Vitória F.C. managers
Boavista F.C. managers
U.D. Leiria managers
F.C. Maia managers
Gil Vicente F.C. managers

C.D. Santa Clara managers